Thomas, Thom, Tom, or Tommy Brooks may refer to:

Politics and religion
 Thomas Brooks (Puritan) (1608–1680), Puritan minister and author
 Thomas Brooks, American minister after whom Brookfield, Connecticut, was named
 Thomas Brooks, 1st Baron Crawshaw (1825–1908), British peer
 Thomas Brooks (Labour politician) (1880–1958), British Labour Party MP
 Overton Brooks (Thomas Overton Brooks, 1897–1961), U.S. Representative from Louisiana
 Thomas Norman Brooks (1924–1992), American politician in Mississippi

Sports
 Tom Brooks (umpire) (1919–2007), Australian cricket umpire and cricketer
 Tom Brooks (footballer) (born 1948), English footballer for Lincoln City
 Tommy Brooks (born 1954), American boxer and trainer

Other
 Thomas Brooks (died 1896), American thief whose death ignited the Brooks–McFarland feud
 Thomas A. Brooks (born 1937), U.S. Navy rear admiral and former director of the Office of Naval Intelligence
 Thomas Brooks III (born 1948), American convicted murderer and fugitive
 Tom Brooks (music producer) (born 1954), American music producer
 Thom Brooks (born 1973), philosopher and legal scholar
 Tom Brooks (writer), British pioneer of theories on prehistoric geometry

See also
 Thomas Brooke (disambiguation)
 Toms Brook, a river in Virginia
 Tom Brook (born 1953), American journalist
 Brooks Thomas (1931–2010), American publishing executive
 Thomas Brooks Mills (1857–1930), American politician and businessman